is a director, storyboard artist, and producer.

Filmography

Anime television
Ocean Waves (1993), Assistant Unit Director 
Yaiba (1993), Director, Storyboard, Assistant Director 
Wedding Peach (1995), Storyboard 
The Doraemons (1995), Image Board 
Berserk (1997), Assistant Director, Storyboard 
White Reflection (Two-Mix PV, 1997), Director, Storyboard 
The Adventures of Mini-Goddess (1998), Storyboard 
To Heart (1999), Storyboard, Unit Director 
Steel Angel Kurumi (1999), Storyboard, Episode Director 
Figure 17 (2001), Storyboard, Episode Director 
Pokémon Chronicles (2002), Storyboard  
Planetes (2003), Storyboard, Episode Director, Key Animation 
Mars Daybreak (2004), Storyboard, Episode Director 
Eureka Seven (2005), Storyboard, Episode Director  
Code Geass: Lelouch of the Rebellion (2006), Storyboard, Episode Director, Associate Director 
Dennō Coil (2007), Storyboard 
Code Geass: Lelouch of the Rebellion R2 (2008), Storyboard, Episode Director, Associate Director, Key Animation 
Tokyo Magnitude 8.0 (2009), Script Cooperation, Series Composition Cooperation 
Gargantia on the Verdurous Planet (2013), Director, Storyboard, Episode Director, Unit Director, Original Concept 
BBK/BRNK (2016), Storyboard
Kado: The Right Answer (2017), General Director 
Blade Runner: Black Lotus (2022), Storyboard

Movies
Only Yesterday (1991 film) (1991), Assistant director 
Porco Rosso (1992), Production Committee 
Baddo batsu maru no ore no pochi wa sekaiichi (1996), Storyboard, Production 
Pokémon: The First Movie (1998), Scene Planning Assistant 
Pokémon 3: The Movie (2000), Unit Director assistant
Pokémon: Jirachi Wish Maker (2003), Assistant Director, Production 
Fullmetal Alchemist: The Sacred Star of Milos (2011), Director

OVA
Ogre Slayer (1994), Storyboard, Production
Makeruna! Ma kendō (1995), Director 
Gunsmith Cats (1995), Production 
Mobile Suit Gundam Unicorn episodes 2 & 3 (2010, 2011), Storyboard, Production 

Web animationXam'd: Lost Memories (2008), Storyboard A.I.C.O. -Incarnation- (2018), Director

Video gamesShenmue II (2000), Movie director in the gameFullmetal Alchemist: Prince of the Dawn'' (2009), Storyboard in the movie

References

Japanese film directors
Japanese film producers
Japanese storyboard artists
1964 births
Living people